The Eighty (Les Quatre-Vingts) were a group of elected French parliamentarians who, on 10 July 1940, voted against the constitutional change that effectively dissolved the Third Republic and established the authoritarian regime of then-Prime Minister Philippe Pétain. Their efforts failed, and Pétain consolidated his regime into the client state of Nazi Germany now known as Vichy France.

Some of the Vichy 80, like Léon Blum, would be go on to be imprisoned by regime, while others managed to join the French Resistance, through groups like the Francs-Tireurs et Partisans and the Brutus network. Several of the Eighty, including Vincent Auriol and Paul Ramadier, would play key roles in the establishment of the French Fourth Republic after the end of World War II.

Background 
Nazi Germany invaded France on 10 May 1940, and Paris fell a month later. Prime Minister Paul Reynaud was opposed to asking for armistice terms, and upon losing the cabinet vote, resigned. President Albert Lebrun appointed Marshal Philippe Pétain as his replacement. France capitulated on 22 June 1940.  Under the terms of the armistice, the northern and Atlantic coast region of France was to be militarily occupied by Germany. The remainder would remain unoccupied, with the French Government remaining at Vichy, remaining responsible for all civil government in France, occupied and unoccupied.

Pétain began a revision of the constitution of the discredited Third Republic. This process was completed with a vote of the combined houses of the parliament on 10 July 1940.

Vote 

27 deputies and senators did not take part in the vote. They had fled Metropolitan France on 21 June, from Bordeaux to Algiers, on board the liner SS Massilia, and they are referred to as the Massilia absentees. They were considered traitors by the collaborationist government, although they were seen as heroes after the war.

The result of the vote was a constitutional amendment that created the new French government. The eighty deputies and senators who opposed the change are referred to as the Vichy 80 (French: "les quatre-vingts"), and they are now famous for their decision to oppose the vote.

Most of the eighty votes against the change were lodged by Socialists or Radical-Socialists. Sixty-one communist parliamentarians had previously had their rights to serve as deputies and senators denied to them in January 1940, as the Soviet Union was a co-belligerent of Nazi Germany at the time. Using data collected from the biographies of parliamentarians, Jean Lacroix, Pierre-Guillaume Méon, and Kim Oosterlinck observe that members of a democratic dynasty, defined as a dynasty whose founder was a defender of democratic ideals, were 9.6 to 15.1 percentage points more likely to oppose the act than other parliamentarians.

Vote tally

List of the 80

References

External links
 List of the MPs
 Original vote
 Le vote du 10 Juillet 1940 (an account in French of the circumstances surrounding the vote) 
An account and statistical analysis of the vote and of the role played by dynastic parliamentarians (in English). 

 
1940 establishments in France
People of Vichy France
French Resistance
1940s in France
Assembly votes
Philippe Pétain
French anti-fascists